Bill Harris is a Republican member of the Montana House of Representatives. As of 2017 he represents District 37.

He previously represented the 29th and 30th Districts. He has served in the 2011, 2013 and 2015 legislative sessions. He was first elected to District 30 of the House of Representatives in 2010, after which he assumed that office on January 3, 2011. Harris served District 30 until being redistricted in 2015. Bill Harris then represented District 29, which encompasses all of Petroleum County and most of Fergus County, Montana. Harris served in the army in the Vietnam War with the 1st Military Intelligence Battalion.

Montana State Legislature

2010 State House of Representatives election

Harris was uncontested in the primary election, having received 1,642 votes.

Harris was also uncontested in the general election, having received 3,527 votes.

References

External links
 archived webpage on Bill Harris

Year of birth missing (living people)
Living people
Republican Party members of the Montana House of Representatives
Montana State University alumni
United States Army personnel of the Vietnam War
People from Garfield County, Montana
People from Lewistown, Montana
Military personnel from Montana
United States Army soldiers